Ellen Johnson (born 1955) is an American activist. The name may also refer to:

 Ellen Cheney Johnson (1829–1899), American prison reformer
 Ellen H. Johnson (1910–1992), historian and professor of modern art
 Ellen Johnson Sirleaf (born 1938), president of Liberia and Nobel Peace Prize winner